Jan Hawel (born 2 April 1988) is a German footballer who plays as a centre-forward for SG Andernach.

Career
Hawel made his professional debut for TuS Koblenz in the 2. Bundesliga on 3 May 2009, coming on as a substitute in the 78th minute for Salvatore Gambino in the 0–2 away loss against Mainz 05.

References

External links
 Profile at DFB.de
 Profile at kicker.de
 SG Andernach statistics at Fussball.de

1988 births
Living people
People from Andernach
Footballers from Rhineland-Palatinate
German footballers
Association football forwards
TuS Koblenz players
2. Bundesliga players
3. Liga players
Regionalliga players
FC Rot-Weiß Koblenz players